Rank comparison chart of enlisted for all navies of Post-Soviet states.

Enlisted (OR 1–9)

References

See also
Comparative navy enlisted ranks of Asia
Comparative navy enlisted ranks of Europe

Military comparisons